Giovanni Battista Falda (Valduggia 7 December 1643 – 22 August 1678 Rome) was an Italian architect, engraver and artist. He is known for his engravings of both contemporary and antique structures of Rome.

Biography

Falda was sent as a boy to Rome, to work in the studio of Bernini, and his draughtsmanship caught the eye of the  publisher Giovanni Giacomo de Rossi.  He engraved for Le fontane di Roma (Fountains in Rome) and for Palazzi di Roma (Palaces of Rome). The former books was expanded after Falda's death with engravings by Francesco Venturini. The latter was published in 1655 in collaboration with Pietro Ferrerio. He is sometimes known as 'Falda da Valduggia' because of his birthplace.

His works became particularly popular with the first waves of Grand Tour participants during the latter parts of the 17th century and Falda became a commercial success as a result. His works appealed to tourists keen to retain a detailed and accurate representation of those parts of Rome they had visited.

References

External links
 Envisioning Baroque Rome (Emory University)

1640s births
1678 deaths
Italian engravers
Italian printmakers
Italian vedutisti
People from Valduggia